Baykalsky (masculine), Baykalskaya (feminine), or Baykalskoye (neuter) may refer to:
Baykalskoye Urban Settlement, a municipal formation which the town of Baykalsk and two rural localities in Slyudyansky District of Irkutsk Oblast, Russia are incorporated as
Baykalskoye (rural locality), a rural locality (a selo) in Severo-Baykalsky District of the Republic of Buryatia, Russia